Permeable Press was a San Francisco-based literary publishing company founded in 1990 by Brian Charles Clark. A "micropress" operating on less than U.S.$100,000 per year, Permeable published a number of trade paperback books, chapbooks, and the literary magazines Puck, Shock Waves, Q-Zine, Naked Review, and Xerotic Ephemera in the early and mid-1990s. Clark sold Permeable Press to Cambrian Publications in 1997.

List of books published
 Shaman by Hugh Fox (1993)
 The Naughty Yard by Michael Hemmingson (1994)   reprinted in The Mammoth Book of International Erotica (Carroll & Graf, 1996) 
 Tonguing the Zeitgeist by Lance Olsen (1994; finalist for the Philip K. Dick Award) 
 Cher Wolfe & Other Stories by Mary Leary (1994)
 Once by Hugh Fox (1995)
 The Final Dream & Other Fictions by Daniel Pearlman (1995)
 Some Girls by Sarah Hafner (1995)
 Reasons For Not Sleeping by Michelle Ben-Hur (1995)
 At The News of Your Death by Joshua Beckman (1995)
 A Beginner's Guide to Art Deconstruction by Norman Conquest (1995)
 Crack Hotel by Michael Hemmingson (1995)
 Three-Hand Jax and Other Spells by Staszek (pen name of Stan Henry; 1996; finalist for the Lambda Literary Award)
 Stairway to the Sun by Hugh Fox (1996)
 The Larger Earth: Descending Notes of a Grounded Astronaut by David Memmott (1996)
 Objects Left Too Long In One Place by Catherine Scherer (1996)
 The Marquis de Sade's Elements of Style by Derek Pell (1996)
 Time Famine by Lance Olsen (1996)
 Toxic Shock Syndrome by Carolina Vegas Starr (1996)
 Flyscraper: Day of the Fly by Mark Romyn (1996)
 The Uncertainty Principle by Steven J. Frank (1997; winner of the Pocket Rocket Award for First Novel)
 Flying Saucers Over Hennepin by Peter Gelman (1997)
 Remote Control by Doug Henderson (1997)
 Minstrels by Michael Hemmingson (1997)
 Manson Family Picnic by R. Downey (1997)
 Ciphers by Paul Di Filippo (1997; co-published with Cambrian Publications)
 Scratch: Four Stories by Nikki Dillon (pen name of Lisa Dierbeck; 1997)
 Shock Waves contributors included Thom Metzger and Paul Di Filippo.

External links
Permeable Press: Undocumented History of an Indie Press

Small press publishing companies
Book publishing companies based in San Francisco
Publishing companies established in 1990